Orthotylus  artemisiae is a species of bug from the Miridae family that can be found in Central Russia and the Nearctic realm.

References

Insects described in 1878
Hemiptera of Europe
artemisiae